The 2011–12 season of BAI Basket (34th edition) ran from November 25, 2011 through May 17, 2012, with 12 teams playing the regular season in a double round robin system. The tournament was cut short due to the Angolan national team's engagement at the Olympics qualification tournament and also due to a strike of referees, in that at the end of the regular season, the best six teams played a double round robin tournament for the title in serie A as did the last six teams for the consolation, serie B.

BAI Basket Participants (2011–12 Season)

Regular Season (November 25, 2011 - March 30, 2012)

Regular Season Standings

As the regular season winner, Primeiro de Agosto is awarded a bonus point for the Final Four.

Final Phase (April 26 - May 22)

Serie A

Serie B

The home team is listed on the left-hand column.The rightmost column and the bottom row list the teams' home and away records respectively.

Interclube vs. Petro Atlético

1º de Agosto vs. Sp de Cabinda

ASA vs. R. do Libolo

ASA vs. 1º de Agosto

Sp de Cabinda vs. Petro Atlético

R. do Libolo vs. Interclube

1º de Agosto vs. Petro Atlético

ASA vs. Interclube

Sp de Cabinda vs. R. do Libolo

Petro Atlético vs. R. do Libolo

ASA vs. Sp de Cabinda

Interclube vs. Sp de Cabinda

Petro Atlético vs. ASA

1º de Agosto vs. R. do Libolo

Final standings

Serie A

Serie B

Awards
2012 BAI Basket MVP
  Olímpio Cipriano (Recreativo do Libolo)

2012 BAI Basket Top Scorer
  Olímpio Cipriano (Recreativo do Libolo)

2012 BAI Basket Top Rebounder
  Hermenegildo Mbunga (Petro Atlético)

2012 BAI Basket Top Assists
  Armando Costa (Primeiro de Agosto)

See also
 2012 Angola Basketball Cup
 2012 Angola Basketball Super Cup
 2012 Victorino Cunha Cup

External links
Official Website 
Eurobasket.com League Page

References

Angolan Basketball League seasons
League
Angola